Lentibacter is a Gram-negative and aerobic genus of bacteria from the family of Rhodobacteraceae with one known species (Lentibacter algarum). Lentibacter algarum has been isolated from the algae Enteromorpha prolifera from Qingdao in China.

References

Rhodobacteraceae
Bacteria genera
Monotypic bacteria genera